The M31 was planned as a Reading to M3 motorway which was dubbed the 'M3 – M4 link motorway'. It would have provided a direct high-speed route between the two motorways. The motorway was planned at the same time as the largely unrealised London Ringways scheme and an additional section was planned that would have taken the M31 south and east from the M3 to connect to the scheme's Ringway 4 (now the M25) providing a shorter route for traffic travelling between the west and Surrey and Kent.

Only part of the planned route was built; it bears the designations A329(M) and A3290.

References

External links
 Pathetic Motorways
 M31
 M31 route map
 Map of planned northern section of M31/A329(M)
 CBRD – A329(M)

Motorways in England
Roads in Berkshire
Roads in Surrey
Cancelled highway projects in the United Kingdom